The 2023 World Junior Speed Skating Championships took place from 10 to 12 February 2023 in Inzell, Germany.

Schedule
All times are local (UTC+1).

Medal summary

Medal table

Men's events

Women's events

References

External links
Official website
Results

2023
World Junior
International speed skating competitions hosted by Germany
World Junior Speed Skating Championships
Sports competitions in Bavaria
2023 in youth sport